The Witch Hunters is a BBC Books original novel written by Steve Lyons and based on the long-running British science fiction television series Doctor Who. It features the First Doctor, Barbara, Ian, and Susan.

This book was republished in 2015 by BBC Books as part of the History Collection.

Synopsis
With the Doctor wanting to repair the TARDIS in peace and quiet, Barbara, Ian and Susan decide to get some experience of living in the nearby village of Salem. But the Doctor knows about the horrors destined to engulf the village and determines that they should leave.

His friends are not impressed. His granddaughter Susan has her own ideas, and is desperate to return, whatever the cost. But perhaps the Doctor was right. Perhaps Susan's actions will lead them all into terrible danger and cause the tragedy that is already unfolding to escalate out of control.

An adventure set during the Salem witch trials (1692-1693), featuring the First Doctor as played by William Hartnell and his companions Susan, Ian and Barbara.

References

External links

The Cloister Library - The Witch Hunters

Novels set in the 1690s
1998 British novels
1998 science fiction novels
Past Doctor Adventures
First Doctor novels
Novels by Steve Lyons
Novels set in Massachusetts
Salem witch trials in fiction